Shamia (Iraq), a city in Al-Shamiya District, Al-Qādisiyyah Governorate, Iraq
 Hilla Shamia (born 1983), Israeli product designer